David with the Head of Goliath is a painting on leather and wood by artist Andrea del Castagno, created around 1450-1457.

Description
It has dimensions  115.5 x 76.5 centimeters. It is in the collection of the National Gallery of Art, Washington, D.C.

Analysis
The painting was designed to be used as a parade shield. It differs from other parade shields in that it depicts a Biblical scene (David slaying Goliath) rather than a coat of arms, or a more ornamental design.

References

1450s paintings
Paintings by Andrea del Castagno
Paintings depicting David
Collections of the National Gallery of Art